Cochise was an English country rock band that performed in the early 1970s.

This band is more significant for who they included than what they produced. Singer Stewart Brown had grown up with Reggie Dwight, later Elton John, and co-founded the band Bluesology with him.  After the demise of Cochise, Mick Grabham made a solo album in 1972 and joined Procol Harum the following year. B.J. Cole also recorded a solo album in 1972, called The New Hovering Dog, before becoming an important session musician playing with Elton John, Uriah Heep and many others throughout the 1970s. Rick Wills and John "Willie" Wilson played on David Gilmour's debut solo album in 1978.

Personnel
Stewart Brown - lead vocals, guitar – born 28 January 1942 
B.J. Cole - pedal steel guitar, Dobro, occasional cello – born 17 June 1946
Mick Grabham - guitar, backing and occasional lead vocals, organ, piano – born 22 January 1948
Rick Wills - bass, backing vocals, percussion – born 5 December 1947
John 'Willie' Wilson - drums, backing vocals, percussion – born 8 July 1947 
John Gilbert - lead vocals – born 1949
Roy O'Temro - drums, percussion – died 1972

Discography

Albums
Cochise (United Artists Uas 29177) 1970 (reissued on CD by Kissing Spell, 2002 - SCD933)
Swallow Tales (Liberty Lbg 83428) 1971 (reissued on CD by Kissing Spell, 2002 - SCD934) 
So Far (United Artists Uas 29286) 1972 (reissued on CD by Kissing Spell, 2002 - SCD935)
Velvet Mountain - An Anthology 1970-1972 (Esoteric Recordings ECLEC 22388) 2013 (2 CD reissue of all three Cochise albums plus the non-LP B side, "Words Of A Dying Man")

Singles
"Watch This Space" / "59th Street Bridge Song" (United Artists UP 35134) 1970 
"Love's Made A Fool Of You" / "Words Of A Dying Man" (Liberty LBF 15425) 1970 
"Why I Sing The Blues" / "Jed Collder" (Liberty LBF 15460) 1971

Compilation albums
The track "Home Again" appears on United Artists Records 1971 sampler All Good Clean Fun (UDX 201/2)
"Home Again" and "Velvet Mountain" appear on the 2004 EMI CD re-package of All Good Clean Fun (Liberty 8660902)

References

Bibliography
The Tapestry of Delights - The Comprehensive Guide to British Music of the Beat, R&B, Psychedelic and Progressive Eras 1963-1976, Vernon Joynson 

British country rock musical groups
Musical groups established in 1969
Musical groups disestablished in 1972
English progressive rock groups